Świętosław or Światosław is one of the Slavic names used in Poland, meaning: święt (holy, strong) and sław (glory, famous). Feminine form is: Świętosława.

See also
 Sviatoslav (disambiguation), another variant of this name with list of bearers

Polish masculine given names
Slavic masculine given names